First opened as a picnic and swimming area in 1953, Lake St. Catherine State Park is a  state park located in Poultney, Vermont on the northern end of Lake Saint Catherine.

Activities include camping, swimming, boating, fishing, hiking, picnicking, wildlife watching and winter sports.

Facilities include 50 tent/RV sites and 11 lean-to sites, a snack bar and boat rentals. Park rangers offers interpretive programs including night hikes, nature crafts, campfire programs, amphibian explorations, and nature games.

The park is administered by the Vermont Department of Forests, Parks, and Recreation as part of the Vermont state park system.

References

External links
Official website

State parks of Vermont
Poultney, Vermont
Protected areas of Rutland County, Vermont
1953 establishments in Vermont
Protected areas established in 1953